Ramón Héctor Ponce (July 5, 1948 in Corrientes, Argentina – July 7, 2019) was an Argentine professional footballer who played in Argentina, Chile and Canada.

Teams
 Boca Juniors 1966-1974
 Gimnasia y Esgrima de La Plata 1975
 Quilmes 1976
 Colo-Colo 1976-1980
 Calgary Boomers 1981

Titles
 Boca Juniors 1969 and 1970 (Argentine Championship)
 Colo-Colo 1979 (Chilean Championship)

References

External links

Profile at BDFA 
NASL stats

1948 births
2019 deaths
Argentine footballers
Argentine expatriate footballers
Argentina international footballers
Boca Juniors footballers
Calgary Boomers players
Colo-Colo footballers
Expatriate soccer players in Canada
Expatriate footballers in Chile
Argentine expatriate sportspeople in Canada
Argentine expatriate sportspeople in Chile
Club de Gimnasia y Esgrima La Plata footballers
North American Soccer League (1968–1984) players
Quilmes Atlético Club footballers
Association football forwards
People from Corrientes
Sportspeople from Corrientes Province